Stephen Johnson (Chinese 詹思文 or 杨顺) (Griswold, Connecticut, 15 April 1803-Gouverneur, New York, 1886) was an American Presbyterian missionary in China. He graduated Amherst College in 1827, then Auburn Theological Seminary 1829-1832. In 1847 he founded the first Christian mission in Fuzhou where he remained till 1853 when he returned to America.

References

1803 births
1886 deaths
People from Griswold, Connecticut
American Presbyterian missionaries
Presbyterian missionaries in China
American expatriates in China